Centre (French) or Sant (Haitian Creole; both meaning "Center") is one of the ten departments of Haiti, located in the center of the country along the border with the Dominican Republic. As of 2015, its estimated population was 746,236. Its capital is Hinche.

History

Taino Period 
The department was part of the Marien kasika and Maguana along side San Juan de la Maguana in the DR under the leadership of Caonabo.

Spanish Period 
Much of the Centre Departement was Spanish territorial even after the Treaty of Ryswick.
Many towns were built and settled by the Spanish like Hincha, Las Caobas, San Rafael and many more.

French Period 
The southern part of the department was French territory with towns like Mirebalais.

Haitian Period

Haitian Revolution 
The department played a big part in the Revolution serving as maroon territory extending to the Baoruco.
Toussaint Louverture capture the town of Hinche from the Spanish for the French making it an early Haitian territory.

Independence 
David Troy commander of Mirebalais is a signatory of the Haitian Declaration of Independance.

In contemporary times the department played a big role in the fight against the American Marines, being a Caco a refuge for men like  Charlemagne Péralte and Benoit Batraville.

Geography 
It borders the Dominican Republic with the province of Elías Piña to the east and is the only landlocked department in Haiti.

Centre is the only department without access to the sea, but is nevertheless affected by soil erosion as a result of deforestation. In 2004, the floods caused by Hurricane Jeanne resulted in hundreds of deaths, focused in Centre and Artibonite Departments.

It contains the second largest lake in Haiti Lake Péligre, which was created as a result of the construction of the Péligre Dam on the Artibonite River during the 1950s. It is the largest hydroelectric dam in the Caribbean.

The Centre department is a high plateau topographical region. Due to its isolation if one of the greenest departments.

Historical places 
 Hinche: Former Dominican territory. Siece to Republic of Haiti in 1929. Birthplace of Charlemagne Péralte, the leader of the Cacos movement, which opposed the American occupation in 1915.
 Mirebalais and Lascahobas: Place of bloody fighting of Toussaint Louverture against the English, who were resupplying in the Central Plateau (1795). Birthplace of Benoît Batraville.

Economy

Tourism
The department had two of Haiti's most impressive waterfalls.
Sodo receives a lot of touris-lokal in August for the Mont-Carmel Vodoun Pilgrimage.
Zim is very beautiful

Agriculture
Centre has great agricultural potential. They are known for their tobacco production, goat and turkey.

Administrative divisions
The Department of Centre is subdivided into four arrondissements, which are further subdivided into twelve communes.

Transport
The RD3 connects it to the North and the West.
The RD304 connects it to Gonaives.
The RD301 connects it to St-Marc.

Cerca la Source Arrondissement
Cerca-la-Source
Thomassique
Hinche Arrondissement
Hinche
Cerca-Cavajal
Maissade
Thomonde
Lascahobas Arrondissement
Lascahobas
Belladere
Savanette
Baptiste
Mirebalais Arrondissement
Mirebalais
Saut-d'Eau
Boucan-Carre

References

 
Departments of Haiti